In chess, a skewer is an attack upon two pieces in a line and is similar to a pin. A skewer is the opposite of a pin; the difference is that in a skewer, the more valuable piece is the one under direct attack and the less valuable piece is behind it. The opponent is compelled to move the more valuable piece to avoid its capture, thereby exposing the less valuable piece which can then be captured (see chess piece relative value). Only  (i.e. bishops, rooks, and queens) can skewer; kings, knights, and pawns cannot.

Details
Compared to the pin, a passive action with only an implied threat, the skewer is a direct attack upon the more valuable piece, making it generally a much more powerful and effective tactic. The victim of a skewer often cannot avoid losing ; the only question is which material will be lost. The skewer occurs less often than the pin in actual play. When it does occur, however, it is often decisive.

Skewers can be broken down into two types: absolute and relative. In an absolute skewer, the king is in check, therefore the check must be handled (under the rules of chess); whereas in a relative skewer, the pieces involved do not necessarily need to be addressed, but it is generally disadvantageous to not address the skewered piece.

Absolute skewer

In this diagram, with White to move, the white king is skewered by the black bishop. This is an absolute skewer, because the rules of chess compel White to get out of check (if possible). After White chooses one of the handful of legal moves available, Black will capture the white queen.

Relative skewer

In this diagram, with Black to move, the black queen is skewered by White's bishop.  To avoid capture of the queen, Black must move the queen, and on the next move, White can capture the rook. This is a relative skewer; Black is likely to move the queen, which is more valuable than the rook—but the choice is still available.

Examples from games

In the game Nigel Short–Rafael Vaganian, Barcelona 1989, White sacrifices a bishop to win a queen by a skewer. White has just played 51.Be5+ (see diagram), skewering Black's king and queen. If Black responds 51...Kxe5 to avoid the immediate loss of the queen, 52.Qc3+ wins the queen by another skewer.  Black resigned in this position.

Defence

Skewers can be escaped by gaining a tempo with a credible threat. For example, if either defending piece leaves the skewer to give check, the other can be rescued on the next move. The skewer can also be reversed into a discovered attack; if the less valuable piece can attack the skewering piece, making a threat with the more valuable piece allows the defender to capture the attacker first (if the threat does not itself drive off the attacker).

If there is empty space between the skewering and the skewered pieces, it may be possible to convert the skewer into a pin by moving a lower-valued piece to intervene.

See also
Chess tactic
Chess terminology
Fork
Pin

References

Bibliography

External links
 Chess Tactics Repository - Skewers - Collection of chess problems involving skewers
 Edward Winter's "The Chess Skewer" (Chess Notes Feature Article)

Chess tactics
Chess terminology